Alexiloga is a genus of moths belonging to the subfamily Tortricinae of the family Tortricidae.

Species
Alexiloga defluxana
Alexiloga rubiginosana (Walker, 1863)

See also
List of Tortricidae genera

References

External links
tortricidae.com

Tortricidae genera
Olethreutinae
Taxa named by Edward Meyrick